Heterothalamus is a genus of South American flowering plants in the daisy family.

 Species
 Heterothalamus alienus (Spreng.) Kuntze - Brazil (Santa Catarina, Rio Grande do Sul), Uruguay, Argentina (Córdoba, La Rioja, San Luis)
 Heterothalamus psiadioides Less. - Santa Catarina

References

Asteraceae genera
Flora of South America
Astereae